Trichocercidae is a family of rotifers belonging to the order Ploima.

Genera:
 Ascomorphella Wiszniewski, 1953
 Coelopus (synonym of Trichocerca)
 Diurella
 Elosa Lord, 1891
 Trichocerca Lamarck, 1801

References

Ploima
Rotifer families